Washington's 4th congressional district encompasses a large area of central Washington, covering the counties of Douglas, Okanogan, Grant, Yakima, Benton, and Klickitat, and parts of Adams and Franklin counties. The district is dominated by the Yakima and Tri-Cities areas. The fourth district is predominantly rural, and is considerably more conservative than the western part of the state.

Its Republican dominance is long-established: no Democratic presidential candidate has carried any county in the district since Bill Clinton in 1992 carried Okanogan County. None of the other counties in the district have backed a Democrat for President since Lyndon B. Johnson in 1964, while Adams County has not voted Democratic since Franklin D. Roosevelt in 1936. George W. Bush carried the district in 2000 and 2004 with 62% and 63% of the vote, respectively. The 4th district also gave John McCain 58% of the vote in 2008, his strongest showing in Washington.

Only three Democrats have ever represented the district in Congress. The last Democrat to represent the district was Jay Inslee, who held the seat during the 103rd Congress. Doc Hastings, Inslee's Republican opponent in 1992, defeated Inslee in a 1994 rematch and served in Congress until he retired in 2014. After losing to Hastings in 1994, Inslee later moved to Bainbridge Island and was sent back to Congress representing the first district in the central Puget Sound area. Inslee was elected the state's governor in 2012, and took office in January 2013. In the 2008 election, Hastings easily defeated challenger George Fearing. The 4th district has been represented in the U.S. House of Representatives by Dan Newhouse since 2015, a Republican from Sunnyside.

Results from presidential elections

List of members representing the district

Recent election results

2012

2014

2016

2018

2020

2022 

}

See also
United States House of Representatives elections in Washington, 2008
United States House of Representatives elections in Washington, 2010
United States House of Representatives elections in Washington, 2012
United States House of Representatives elections in Washington, 2014

References

 Congressional Biographical Directory of the United States 1774–present; accessed November 8, 2014.

External links
Washington State Redistricting Commission
Find your new congressional district: a searchable map, Seattle Times, January 13, 2012

04